The 2014 World Sprint Speed Skating Championships, officially the Essent ISU World Sprint Speed Skating Championships 2014, were held in Nagano, Japan, from 18 to 19 January 2014.

The defending champions were Michel Mulder of the Netherlands for men and Heather Richardson of the United States for women. In the men's championships, Mulder was able to retain his title. Shani Davis of the United States won the silver, and Daniel Greig of Australia won the bronze, thereby clinching his nation's first-ever medal at an international long-track speed skating competition. In the women's championships, Yu Jing of China re-claimed her title from 2012, while her compatriot Zhang Hong won the silver, and Richardson had to settle for the bronze medal.

Schedule
The schedule of events:

All times are JST (UTC+9).

Rules 
All participating skaters are allowed to skate the two 500 meters and one 1000 meters; 24 skaters may take part on the second 1000 meters. These 24 skaters are determined by the samalog standings after the three skated distances, and comparing these lists as follows:

 Skaters among the top 24 on both lists are qualified.
 To make up a total of 24, skaters are then added in order of their best rank on either list.

World records

World records going into the championships.

Men

Women

Men's championships

Day 1

500 metres

1000 metres

Day 2

500 metres

Ranking after three events

1000 metres

Final ranking

Women's championships

Day 1

500 metres

1000 metres

Day 2

500 metres

Ranking after three events

1000 metres

Final ranking

References

World Sprint Championships
2014 Sprint
World Sprint, 2014
Sports competitions in Nagano (city)
2014 in Japanese sport
World Sprint Speed Skating Championships